New Minden is a village in Washington County, Illinois, United States. The population was 215 at the 2010 census. It possessed a post office from 1868 to 1976.

History

2013 tornado

At approximately 12:00pm on November 17, 2013, an EF4 tornado ripped through the town. It destroyed a few houses and caused major damage to St. John's Lutheran Church. The tornado would cause major damage to Flying M Ranch, which is just northeast of town and caused damage in the Hoyleton area. The tornado was on the ground for 10.6 miles and had winds estimated at 180 MPH. The tornado resulted in two deaths in the New Minden area.

Geography
New Minden is located at  (38.437008, -89.369011).

Illinois Routes 127 and 177 intersect in the town.

Demographics

As of the census of 2000, there were 204 people, 88 households, and 62 families residing in the village. The racial makeup of the village was 99.51% White, and 0.49% from two or more races. Hispanic or Latino of any race were 1.47% of the population.

There were 88 households, out of which 28.4% had children under the age of 18 living with them, 54.5% were married couples living together, 11.4% had a female householder with no husband present, and 29.5% were non-families. 26.1% of all households were made up of individuals, and 15.9% had someone living alone who was 65 years of age or older. The average household size was 2.32 and the average family size was 2.76.

In the village, the population was spread out, with 25.0% under the age of 18, 5.4% from 18 to 24, 29.9% from 25 to 44, 21.6% from 45 to 64, and 18.1% who were 65 years of age or older. The median age was 38 years. For every 100 females, there were 75.9 males. For every 100 females age 18 and over, there were 71.9 males.

The median income for a household in the village was $41,875, and the median income for a family was $45,417. Males had a median income of $30,000 versus $19,286 for females. The per capita income for the village was $17,942. None of the families and 2.5% of the population were living below the poverty line, including no under eighteens and 10.0% of those over 64.

Religion

New Minden is home to one of the original 14 churches of the Lutheran Church–Missouri Synod, St. John's Evangelical Lutheran Church (1847).

References

Villages in Illinois
Villages in Washington County, Illinois
Populated places established in 1840